Kody Michael Hoese (born July 13, 1997) is an American professional baseball third baseman in the Los Angeles Dodgers organization.

Amateur career 
Hoese attended Griffith High School in Griffith, Indiana. As a senior, he hit .388 with four home runs and 29 RBIs. Undrafted out of high school in the 2016 MLB draft, he enrolled at Tulane University to play college baseball for the Tulane Green Wave.

In 2017, as a freshman at Tulane, Hoese hit .213 with zero home runs and 10 RBIs in 44 games. As a sophomore in 2018, he started all 58 of Tulane's games at third base and batted .291 with five home runs and 31 RBIs. He was drafted by the Kansas City Royals in the 35th round of the 2018 MLB draft, but did not sign. After the season, he played in the New England Collegiate Baseball League for the Newport Gulls, hitting .283 with seven home runs and 25 RBIs in 38 games. In 2019, Hoese's junior year, he hit .391 with 23 home runs and sixty RBIs in 56 games and was named the American Athletic Conference Player of the Year.

Professional career 
Hoese was selected by the Los Angeles Dodgers in the first round of the 2019 Major League Baseball draft with the 25th overall pick. He signed for $2.74 million and made his professional debut on June 17, 2019, with the Rookie-level Arizona League Dodgers. He had three hits, all doubles, in three at-bats in that game. After 19 games in the Arizona League, he was promoted to the Great Lakes Loons of the Class A Midwest League in July, with whom he finished the season. Over 41 games between the two clubs, Hoese slashed .299/.380/.483 with five home runs and 29 RBIs.

For the 2021 season, he was assigned to the Tulsa Drillers of the Double-A Central, slashing .188/.241/.245 with two home runs and 17 RBIs over 59 games. He missed two months during the season due to injury. He was selected to play in the Arizona Fall League for the Glendale Desert Dogs after the season. He returned to Tulsa to begin the 2022 season. In late May, he was placed on the injured list with a groin injury before being activated in late June. He played in 77 games for the Drillers, hitting .232 with five home runs and 34 RBIs.

References

External links 

Tulane Green Wave bio

Living people
1997 births
Baseball players from Indiana
Tulane Green Wave baseball players
Bellingham Bells players
Newport Gulls players
Baseball third basemen
Minor league baseball players
Arizona League Dodgers players
Great Lakes Loons players
Tulsa Drillers players
Arizona Complex League Dodgers players
Glendale Desert Dogs players